Brandon Sesay (born December 16, 1986) is an American football defensive lineman for the Albany Empire of the National Arena League (NAL). He played college football at the Texas Tech University and attended Douglass High School in Atlanta, Georgia. He has been a member of the Iowa Barnstormers, West Texas Roughnecks, San Antonio Talons, Tampa Bay Storm, Portland Steel and Washington Valor.

Early life
Sesay attended Douglass High School.

College career
In November 2004, Sesay committed to play football for the Georgia Bulldogs. However Sesay did not make it to Georgia and enrolled at Northwest Mississippi Community College in 2005. Sesay transferred to the College of the Sequoias for the 2006, before transferring to Texas Tech. Sesay played for the Red Raiders from 2008 to 2009. He was the team's starter his final three years and helped the Red Raiders to 20 wins. He played in 11 games during his career.

Professional career

Iowa Barnstormers
Sesay was assigned to the Iowa Barnstormers for the 2011 season. Sesay tallied 17 tackles and 2.0 sacks.

West Texas Roughnecks
Sesay placed with the West Texas Roughnecks of the Lone Star Football League in 2012.

San Antonio Talons
On December 12, 2012, Sesay was assigned to the San Antonio Talons. Sesay was assigned to the Talons again on March 18, 2013. Sesay was assigned and reassigned by the Talons all season long during the 2013 season and never appeared in a game. Sesay played with the Talons again in 2014, compiling 23 tackles and 4.0 sacks.

Tampa Bay Storm
Sesay was assigned to the Tampa Bay Storm on March 5, 2015.

Portland Steel
Sesay played with the Portland Steel in 2016.

Washington Valor
Sesay was assigned to the Washington Valor in 2017. On May 9, 2018, he was placed on reassignment.

Albany Empire
On May 17, 2018, Sesay was assigned to the Albany Empire. On March 7, 2019, Sesay was assigned to the Empire.

Albany Empire (NAL)
On September 9, 2021, Sesay signed with the Albany Empire of the National Arena League (NAL). On November 1, 2022, Sesay re-signed with the Empire.

References

Living people
1986 births
Players of American football from Georgia (U.S. state)
American football defensive linemen
Northwest Mississippi Rangers football players
College of the Sequoias Giants football players
Texas Tech Red Raiders football players
Iowa Barnstormers players
Odessa Roughnecks players
San Antonio Talons players
Tampa Bay Storm players
Portland Steel players
Washington Valor players
Albany Empire (AFL) players